Richard Rodgers Sr. (born October 8, 1961) is an American football coach and former player who is the senior defensive assistant and safeties coach for the Washington Commanders of the National Football League (NFL). A former Arena Football League player, he is the father of Philadelphia Eagles player Richard Rodgers II who is known for the Miracle in Motown. He began coaching as soon as he retired from the Arena Football League as a player. Rodgers is also known for being a part of "The Play" against Stanford, when he was a college football player for the California Golden Bears and earned All-Pac-10 Conference honors as a defensive back.

References

External links
Washington Commanders bio
JustSportsStats.com bio

1961 births
Living people
American football linebackers
American football wide receivers
California Golden Bears football players
Chicago Bruisers players
Denver Dynamite (arena football) players
Los Angeles Cobras players
Sacramento Attack players
San Jose State Spartans football coaches
Portland State Vikings football coaches
New Mexico State Aggies football coaches
Holy Cross Crusaders football coaches
Carolina Panthers coaches
Washington Commanders coaches
Washington Football Team coaches
African-American coaches of American football
African-American players of American football
21st-century African-American people
20th-century African-American sportspeople